Serum amyloid A4, constitutive is a protein that in humans is encoded by the SAA4 gene.

References

Further reading